Lipsyte is a surname. Notable people with the surname include:

 Robert Lipsyte (born 1938), American sports journalist and author
 Sam Lipsyte (born 1968), American novelist and short story writer, son of Robert